The U.S. state of Oregon has had six United States congressional districts since 2023, when the 6th district was created as a result of the 2020 census. The 5th district was added as a result of the 1980 census, and boundaries were redrawn following the population changes to each district as determined by the 1990, 2000, 2010, and 2020 censuses.

Current districts and representatives
List of members of the United States House delegation from Oregon, their terms, their district boundaries, and the district political ratings according to the CPVI. The delegation has a total of six members, including four Democrats, and two Republicans.

Historical and present district boundaries
Table of United States congressional district boundary maps in the State of Oregon, presented chronologically. All redistricting events that took place in Oregon between 1973 and 2013 are shown.

Obsolete districts
Oregon Territory's at-large congressional district, obsolete since statehood
Oregon's at-large congressional district (1859–1893)

See also 
 List of United States congressional districts
 Lists of Oregon-related topics
 Oregon State Senate, with a map of state senate districts

References

External links
 Maps of Oregon congressional districts, from the U.S. Geological Survey

 
Politics of Oregon